Jazz Radio 94.1FM is a radio station in Australia.

References

Radio stations on the Gold Coast, Queensland
Community radio stations in Australia
Radio stations established in 2001
Jazz radio stations
Australian jazz